Gretchen Anne Rush (born February 7, 1964), also known by her married name Gretchen Magers, is a former professional tennis player from the United States who was active in the 1980s and early 1990s.

Rush played tennis at Trinity University in San Antonio, Texas from 1983 to 1986, where she was a four-time All-American. While at Trinity, she won the Broderick Award (now the Honda Sports Award) as the nation's top collegiate tennis player in 1986.

During her career, Rush reached the singles quarter-finals at Wimbledon, the US Open and the French Open. She won three top-level singles titles: Auckland in 1987, Schenectady in 1988, and Moscow in 1989, and she reached a career-high singles ranking of no. 22 on March 12, 1990. She was runner-up in the 1988 mixed doubles at Wimbledon, partnering Kelly Jones.

Rush retired from the professional tour in 1992, but has continued to play in seniors events.

In 2016, she was inducted into the Women's Collegiate Tennis Hall of Fame.

WTA Tour finals

Singles 4 (3–1)

Doubles 13 (4–9)

Mixed doubles 1 (0–1)

References

External links
 
 

American female tennis players
Olympic tennis players of the United States
Tennis players from Pittsburgh
Tennis players at the 1983 Pan American Games
Tennis players at the 1984 Summer Olympics
Trinity Tigers women's tennis players
Pan American Games medalists in tennis
1964 births
Living people
Pan American Games gold medalists for the United States
Universiade medalists in tennis
Universiade silver medalists for the United States
Universiade bronze medalists for the United States
Medalists at the 1985 Summer Universiade